The Median Wall was a wall built to the north of the ancient city of Babylon at a point where the distance between the rivers Tigris and Euphrates decreases considerably. It was believed to have been constructed during the latter part of the reign of Nebuchadrezzar II and to have consisted of baked brick and bitumen, with centre of the wall being packed with earth. The wall was built to prevent any potential invasion by the Medes from the north — hence the name 'Median' Wall.

References

Sources
Warner, Rex, trans. Xenophon - The Persian Expedition. Introduction & Notes by George Caldwell. England: Penguin Books, 1949–1972. .

Archaeological sites in Iraq
Ancient Mesopotamia
Anabasis (Xenophon)
Medes
Babylon
Fortification lines
City walls